Dwayne Wright (born 25 January 1989) is a Caymanian footballer who plays as a forward. He has represented the Cayman Islands during a World Cup qualifying match in 2011.

References

Association football forwards
Living people
1989 births
Caymanian footballers
Cayman Islands international footballers
Elite SC players
Roma United players